The Air Sylphe Bi 582 is a French powered parachute that was designed and produced by Air Sylphe of Villereau, Nord. Now out of production, when it was available the aircraft was supplied as a complete ready-to-fly-aircraft.

The company seems to have gone out of business in the end of 2007 and production ended by that date.

Design and development
It features a  parachute-style wing designed by Xavier Demoury,  two-seats-in-tandem  accommodation, tricycle landing gear and a single  Rotax 582 engine in pusher configuration.

The aircraft carriage is built from metal tubing with a ducted fan derived from an industrial air ventilation system. The main landing gear incorporates spring rod suspension. There is also a special version of the aircraft to accommodate wheelchair aviators.

Specifications (Bi 582)

References

447
2000s French sport aircraft
2000s French ultralight aircraft
Single-engined pusher aircraft
Powered parachutes